Breisgau-S-Bahn GmbH (BSB) was a regional railway operator in the German state of Baden-Württemberg. It was a subsidiary of Südwestdeutsche Verkehrs-Aktiengesellschaft (SWEG), a transport company owned by the state of Baden-Württemberg. The company was founded in 1995.

The company operated S-Bahn services over DB Netz AG-owned tracks in the area around Freiburg. The services ran on short sections of the main line Rhine Valley Railway, together with the Elztalbahn and Breisachbahn branch lines.

The company was merged into its parent in December 2017.

References

External links 
 
 Official Internet presence of the Breisgau S-Bahn
 Data on the local passenger transport concept of the Breisgau S-Bahn

Transport in Freiburg im Breisgau
Railway companies of Germany
Breisgau-Hochschwarzwald
Emmendingen (district)